The Copa Apertura Segunda División was an official football cup competition for Chilean teams playing only in the second level of the Chilean football system.
It was played with irregularity between 1969 and 1990.

Finals

Titles by club

Notes and references

Chile Cup - RSSSF

Football competitions in Chile